Strichtarn  was a military camouflage pattern developed in East Germany and used from 1965 to 1990. The pattern was also used by several other militaries and non-state forces, notably in Africa.

History

The Strichtarn was adopted by East Germany in 1965 in service with the National People's Army (NVA) to replace the Flächentarn, also called Blumentarn, which had been adopted in 1958. The NVA decided to adopt a new camouflage pattern in order to address problems with East German forces appearing too similar to those of the Soviet Army. In East German service, the new pattern was known as "Kampfanzug 64".. The pattern very closely resembles the Czechoslovakian Rain Pattern, which itself borrowed from Wehrmacht-era patterns. 

The practical effectiveness of Strichtarn is borderline at best, when compared against British Disruptive Pattern Material or US Military M81 BDU in the same environment. The new uniform patterns were issued to the NVA during the late 1960s, and were later supplied in large numbers to communist movements throughout Africa.

East Germany also supplied Strichtarn in large amounts to communist guerrilla movements throughout Africa, where it was known as "rice fleck" camouflage.

Design 
Strichtarn was designed with broken vertical red-brown lines on a grey-green field, which was also known as the raindrop pattern. The patterns made for the Strichtarn consisted of Type 1, which was made from 1965 to 1967, and the Type 2, which was made from 1967 to 1990.

The pattern is also seen as helmet covering for the M56 helmet.

Users

 : Numerous Strichtarn variants were used by Croatian forces during the Yugoslav Wars. Most were acquired as surplus gear alongside M56/76 helmets and used until 1992, when Strichtarn-based clothing supplies ran out.
 : Strichtarn was adopted as the vz. 60 Jehličí by Czechoslovakian forces; the Czechoslovak version differs by having a two-tone background.
 : East Germany adopted Strichtarn in 1965.
 : Used by the Estonian Defense League in the 1990s after the Cold War.
 : Acquired surplus Strichtarns for the Kyrgyz military during the 1990s.
 : The Polish Army adopted a Strichtarn-like pattern known as wz.58 "Deszczyk" (rain) in 1958, first issued to airborne units. The camouflage pattern was then issued to other parts of the armed forces and remained in use into the 1970s before being replaced by wz 68 "Mora".
 : Formerly used by Rwandan Patriotic Front (RPF) fighters.
 : The South African Defence Force used the pattern. Clones were made for South African Special Forces operators during the South African Border War.
 : Strichtarn camouflage uniforms and fabric were worn by Airborne and Special Task Force personnel of the Army from approximately 2002-2006.

Non-state actors
 FAPLA
 FRELIMO
 SWAPO
 UNITA

References

Bibliography 
 
 
 
 
 
 

Military camouflage
Camouflage patterns
Military equipment introduced in the 1960s